Lake Martha is a natural lake in South Dakota, in the United States.

According to the Federal Writers' Project, the origin of the name is obscure.

See also
List of lakes in South Dakota

References

Lakes of South Dakota
Lakes of Marshall County, South Dakota